is a train station in Ube, Yamaguchi Prefecture, Japan.

Lines
West Japan Railway Company
Ube Line

Adjacent stations

|-
!colspan=5|JR West

Railway stations in Japan opened in 1923
Railway stations in Yamaguchi Prefecture